Bellevue is a Canadian television crime drama series, it premiered on CBC Television on February 20, 2017. Created by Jane Maggs and Adrienne Mitchell, the series stars Anna Paquin as Annie Ryder, a police officer investigating the disappearance of a transgender teen while also dealing with the return of a mysterious person from her past.

The series is produced by Muse Entertainment and Back Alley Film Productions Ltd.

On May 24, 2017 it was announced that the series had been canceled by CBC, whereas a second season is in development, according to executive producer Adrienne Mitchell, but "production of a follow-up season is currently not moving forward."

The show began airing in the United States on WGN America on January 23, 2018, with On Demand service My5 acquiring the UK rights, allowing streaming from June 29, 2019.

Cast

Main 
 Anna Paquin as Annie Ryder, a detective who is investigating the disappearance and later murder of Jesse Sweetland
 Shawn Doyle as Peter Welland, Police Chief of Bellevue
 Billy MacLellan as Brady Holt, a detective
 Sharon Taylor as Virginia Panamick, a detective of First Nations heritage
 Patrick Labbé as Clarence Ryder, Annie's deceased father, a police detective who committed suicide when Annie was eight years old / Adam, Annie's brother
 Vincent Leclerc as Tom Edmonds, the coach of the junior hockey team
 Janine Theriault as Mayor Lily "Mother" Mansfield
 Victoria Sanchez as Maggie Sweetland, Jesse Sweetland's mother
 Joe Cobden as Father Jameson
 Allen Leech as Eddie Rowe, an unemployed miner and Annie's on and off again boyfriend and father of Daisy

Recurring 
 Madison Ferguson, (Actor, https://www.imdb.com/name/nm5469410/) Madison Ferguson as Daisy Ryder, Annie and Eddie's daughter
 Emelia Hellman as Bethany Mansfield, Mayor Mansfield's daughter
 Robert Naylor as Jacob Cowan, Bethany's boyfriend who is on Jesse's hockey team
 Sadie O'Neil as Jesse Sweetland, a hockey player who is a transgender teen, later found dead by Annie
 Cameron Roberts as Danny Debessage, Jesse's boyfriend
 Amber Goldfarb as Briana Holt, Brady's sister
 Patricia Summersett as Nikki Ryder, Annie's mother
 Andreas Apergis as Neil Driver, Sandy Driver's father
 Raphael Grosz-Harvey as Sid Oak
 Hebree Ahrys Larratt as 7–8 year old Annie
 Angela Magri as Sandy Driver, a teen who was murdered, Annie's father investigated her murder
 Susan Bain as Bev, a clerk in the police department
 Ryan Doherty as Max Bennett, a hockey player who is on Jesse's team
 Patrick Abellard as Jim

Episodes

References

External links
 
 

2017 Canadian television series debuts
2017 Canadian television series endings
2010s Canadian crime drama television series
2010s Canadian television miniseries
CBC Television original programming
Transgender-related television shows
2010s Canadian LGBT-related drama television series
Television series by Muse Entertainment